Leopold I of Lippe (2 December 1767 – 5 November 1802) was a Prince of Lippe.

Biography
Leopold I was born in Detmold the son of Simon August, Count of Lippe-Detmold (1727–1782), and his second wife, Princess Leopoldine of Anhalt-Dessau (1746–1769).

He received his education in Dessau, and when he reached 18 he went to study at the University of Leipzig. He succeeded his father as Count of Lippe-Detmold on his death on 1 May 1782, and remained Count until Lippe was raised to a Principality of the Holy Roman Empire in 1789.

In 1790, a mental disorder was diagnosed, and he was incapacitated by the Imperial Chamber Court; in 1795, the guardianship was conditionally lifted after an improvement occurred.

He died in Detmold and was succeeded as Prince by his eldest son, who became Leopold II.

Marriage and children
He was married to Pauline Christine of Anhalt-Bernburg (23 February 1769 – 29 December 1820), daughter of Frederick Albert, Prince of Anhalt-Bernburg, and Louise Albertine of Schleswig-Holstein, on 2 January 1796 in Ballenstedt. From the marriage he had two sons:

 Leopold II, Prince of Lippe (1796–1851)
 Prince Friedrich (1797–1854)

Ancestry

References 
 Wilhelm van Kempen: Die Korrespondenz des Detmolder Generalsuperintendenten Ewald mit dem Fürsten Leopold Friedrich Franz von Anhalt-Dessau 1790–1794/1798. In: Lippesche Mitteilungen. 33. 1964, p. 135–177. 
 Mächtige Stimme der Gerechtigkeit an die hohe Reichsversammlung in Regensburg die gegen den regierenden Fürsten von Lippe-Detmold verübte Usurpazionssache betreffend. Ein wichtiges Gegenstück zu den fürstneuwiedischen Rekursakten. 1795. 
 Rotberg: Wahrhafte Krankheits- und Curatelgeschichte des regierenden Fürsten zur Lippe. Mit Urkunden. Nebst einer kurzen Erörterung der Frage: Wann und wie eine Curatelanordnung über einen deutschen Reichsstand Statt habe? 1795. 
 Mitteilungen aus der lippischen Geschichte und Landeskunde, Bände 10–13, Meyersche Hofbuchhandlung Verlag., 1914, p. 61

1767 births
1802 deaths
House of Lippe
Princes of Lippe
German princes